IC 4665 (Collinder 349 / Melotte 179) is an open cluster in the constellation Ophiuchus. It was discovered by Philippe Loys de Chéseaux in 1745. The cluster began to develop less than 40 million years ago, and lies about 1,400 light years away from Earth. It is easily visible in the smallest of telescopes and also with binoculars. From a sufficiently dark place it is also visible to the naked eye.  It is one of the brightest clusters not to be cataloged by Charles Messier or William Herschel, probably because it is so loose and coarse.

References

External links 
 
 IC 4665 @ SEDS IC objects pages
 IC 4665 www.univie.ac.at
 
 X-Ray Activity in the Open Cluster IC 4665 National Aeronautics and Space Administration

4665
Open clusters
Ophiuchus (constellation)